Levi Stanley Junior Reid (born 19 December 1983) is an English footballer who plays as a midfielder.

He played for Port Vale between 2003 and 2005, before dropping into non-league football with Stafford Rangers. He signed with Macclesfield Town, but moved on to Oxford United the following year. In 2009, he returned to Rangers for another two-year spell. He signed with Telford United in March 2011, before joining Gainsborough Trinity in January 2012 following a loan spell at Chasetown. He returned to Stafford Rangers in October 2012, and helped the club to win the Northern Premier League Division One South in 2015–16. His brother, Izak Reid, is a professional footballer – the pair played together at Macclesfield.

Career

Port Vale
Reid started his career at Port Vale, rising from the youth ranks to make his first team debut on the last day of the 2002–03 season, a 2–0 defeat at Bristol City. He came on as a 65th minute substitute, replacing the veteran John Durnin. He made his full debut on 8 November 2003, in an embarrassing 2–2 draw with non-league Ford United at Vale Park, during an FA Cup first round encounter. Reid made fourteen appearances in the 2003–04 season. A regular in the first team throughout the 2004–05 season, he scored his first senior goal in an FA Cup tie with Kidderminster Harriers on 12 November. He was released in May 2005 by manager Martin Foyle, having made 49 appearances for the "Valiants" in all competitions. At his trial for affray later the year, his defence team stated that he had been released from his contract due to his part in a nightclub brawl.

Non-league
Joining Stafford Rangers, his strike in the Conference North play-off final penalty shootout booked Rangers a place in the Conference National for the 2006–07 season. Rangers struggled to adapt to their new division in 2006–07, though Reid was a regular in the latter half of the season. Reid made his return to the English Football League in 2007–08, joining Macclesfield Town on trial, who were managed by his former teammate Ian Brightwell. He impressed at the season's start and was offered a four-month deal. Enjoying regular football for the League Two club, he signed an end-of-season deal in December. In August 2008 he joined Oxford United on trial, alongside former Macclesfield teammate Michael Husbands. Reid was given a six-month contract with Oxford, but left late in September 2008 to help care for his sick baby back in Stafford.

In August 2009 he re-signed with Stafford Rangers. At the end of the 2009–10 campaign he left the club to search for full-time football, but returned to Rangers after his search was unsuccessful. Rangers were relegated out of the Conference North at the end of the 2010–11 season, but Reid managed to win a short-term deal at Telford United in March. Telford won the Conference North play-offs to seal a place in the Conference National, and though Reid failed to make a first team appearance he was still invited back to the club in the summer to try to prove himself worthy of a new deal. In September 2011, he was loaned out to Chasetown of the Northern Premier League Premier Division. He made 11 appearances for the "Scholars", scoring one goal.

On 3 January 2012, he joined Conference North side Gainsborough Trinity. Steve Housham's side qualified for the play-offs with a fourth-place finish in 2011–12, but lost 1–0 to Nuneaton Town in the final. Reid was not amongst those players retained at the end of the season and thus departed The Northolme. He joined up with Stafford Rangers, now of the Northern Premier League, for a third time in October 2012. The club finished 15th in 2012–13, before being relegated at the end of the 2013–14 season. Rangers ended the 2014–15 season outside the Division One South play-offs on goal difference. They won promotion as champions in the 2015–16 season, and Reid was voted Players' Player of the Year and Directors' Player of the Year. He made his 250th appearance for the club in January 2017. Rangers finished 13th in the Northern Premier League Premier Division in 2016–17 and then 14th in 2017–18.

Personal life
His younger brother, Izak Reid, is a professional footballer – the pair played together at Macclesfield Town.

Career statistics
Source:

Honours
Stafford Rangers
Conference North play-offs: 2005–06
Northern Premier League Division One South: 2015–16

References

Sportspeople from Stafford
1983 births
Living people
English footballers
Association football midfielders
Port Vale F.C. players
Stafford Rangers F.C. players
Macclesfield Town F.C. players
Oxford United F.C. players
AFC Telford United players
Chasetown F.C. players
Gainsborough Trinity F.C. players
English Football League players
Northern Premier League players
National League (English football) players